Colleges, universities and K–12 education in Duluth, Minnesota

Colleges and Universities 
University of Minnesota Duluth
The College of St. Scholastica
Lake Superior College
Duluth Business University
Cosmetology Careers Unlimited
Itasca Community College

K–12 Education

Public schools
Most public schools are administered by Duluth Public Schools. There are several independent public charter schools in the Duluth area not administered by District 709 with open enrollment.

Public Elementary Schools 
 Congdon Park (K–5)
 Homecroft (K–5)
 Lakewood (K–5)
 Laura MacArthur (K–5)
 Lester Park (K–5)
 Lowell (K–5)
 Myers–Wilkins (K–5)
 Piedmont (K–5)
 Stowe (K–5)

Public Middle Schools 
 Ordean East Middle School (6–8)
 Lincoln Park Middle School (6–8)

Public High Schools 
 Duluth Denfeld High School (9–12)
 Duluth East High School (9–12)

Charter schools
 Harbor City International School (9–12)
 North Shore Community School (PreK–6)
 North Star Academy, Edison Charter School (K–8) 
 Raleigh Academy, Edison Charter School (K–5)

Alternative Public Schools 
 Adult Learning Center
 Chester Creek Academy
 Merritt Creek Academy
 Secondary Technical Center
 Unity High School (Located at the Historic Old Central High School)
 Woodland Hills Academy

Non-public schools

Independent schools
Independent schools are governed by an independent board of trustees and do not have any affiliation with or oversight from religious or government organizations. They are often accredited by a regional agency that is associated with the National Association of Independent Schools.

 The Marshall School (4–12, independent, ISACS accredited)
 Montessori School of Duluth (Preschool / Elementary, independent, AMI-certified teachers) 
 Many Rivers Montessori (toddler to 8, independent, AMI accredited)

Catholic schools 
Catholic elementary schools in Duluth were unified in April 2017 as one school with three locations. They are under the administration of the Roman Catholic Diocese of Duluth.

 Stella Maris Academy
 Holy Rosary Campus (PreK-4)
 St. John the Evangelist Campus (5-8)
 St. James Campus (PreK-8)
 St. Michael's Lakeside Early Learning (Toddlers, Half-Day Preschool, Full-Day Preschool, Elementary After-School Care)

Private Schools (Non-Catholic) 
 Lakeview Christian Academy (PreK–12) 
 Stone Ridge Christian School
 Summit School

External links
 Duluth Public Schools website
 Lakeview Christian Academy website
 Stella Maris Academy website

References 

Education in Duluth, Minnesota
Schools in St. Louis County, Minnesota
Duluth